Galizien may refer to:
German for Galicia (Eastern Europe)
Ukrainian SS Division "Galizien"